Wait for Me in Heaven is a 1988 Spanish comedy film directed by Antonio Mercero.

Plot

Paulino Alonso is an orthopedist who bears a strong resemblance to Spanish caudillo Francisco Franco and is kidnapped one day to be used as a double during public appearances that are too risky for the real Franco.

Cast 
 Pepe Soriano – Francisco Franco
 José Sazatornil – Alberto Sinsoles 
 Chus Lampreave – Emilia
  – Luis
 Amparo Valle – Rosa
 Paco Cambres – Capellán de El Pardo 
 José Luis Barceló – Almirante Carrero Blanco
 Josefina Calatayud – Carmen Polo
  – Egyptian ambassador

References

External links 

1988 films
1988 comedy films
Spanish comedy films
Spanish satirical films
Films set in Spain
Films shot in Spain
Anti-Francoism
Films about Francisco Franco
1980s Spanish-language films
1980s Spanish films